"Spring Can Really Hang You Up the Most" (1955) is a popular song with lyrics by Fran Landesman, set to music by Tommy Wolf. The title is a jazz rendition of the opening line of T.S. Eliot's The Waste Land, "April is the cruellest month". The song describes how somebody feels sad and depressed despite all the good things associated with spring.

Collaboration
Tommy Wolf was a pianist, composer, arranger, and musical director who met Fran Landesman while she was sitting in the bar of the Crystal Palace, a night club in St. Louis. Wolf was on the bandstand playing.  This experience inspired her to begin writing song lyrics and in 1952 Wolf began setting her lyrics to music.  More Landesman–Wolf collaborations followed, including the melodies for the songs for the Broadway musical The Nervous Set.

Notable recordings
Jackie Cain and Roy Kral – Storyville Presents Jackie & Roy (1955)
Ella Fitzgerald – Clap Hands, Here Comes Charlie! (1961)
Mark Murphy – Rah! (1961)
Stan Getz – Reflections (1963)
Julie London - Sophisticated Lady (1962)
Carmen McRae – Bittersweet (1964)
Hampton Hawes and Martial Solal – Key for Two (1968)
Blossom Dearie – Winchester in Apple Blossom Time (1977)
Betty Carter – The Audience with Betty Carter (1979)
Ian Shaw - A Ghost in Every Bar: The Lyrics of Fran Landesman (Splash Point, 2012)
Bette Midler - Some People's Lives (1990)
Norah Jones - Spring Can Really Hang You Up The Most / Come Away With (2022)
Radka Toneff - Live in Hamburg (1992,recorded in 1981)

References

External links
"Spring Can Really Hang You Up the Most" at Jazz Standards
"Fran Landesman biography" at Fran Landesman

Songs with lyrics by Fran Landesman
1955 songs
Ella Fitzgerald songs
Bette Midler songs
Barbra Streisand songs